Claude Peter (19 December 1947 – 11 May 2022) was a French basketball player who played as a point guard. He played one season for FC Mulhouse Basket before finishing fourteen seasons with Le Mans Sarthe Basket. He played in 50 games for the French national team.

References

1947 births
2022 deaths
French men's basketball players
France national basketball team players
French basketball coaches
FC Mulhouse Basket players
Le Mans Sarthe Basket players
Le Mans Sarthe Basket coaches